Simon Pickle Stone House is a historic home located at Miles Township, Centre County, Pennsylvania.  It was built in 1833, and is a -story sandstone building, with a -story kitchen wing.  It has a two-story, frame store and summer kitchen addition built about 1850.  The house was remodeled between 1911 and 1920.

It was added to the National Register of Historic Places in 1977.

References

Houses on the National Register of Historic Places in Pennsylvania
Houses completed in 1833
Houses in Centre County, Pennsylvania
National Register of Historic Places in Centre County, Pennsylvania